Gaina Tino is a Samoan politician and former Cabinet Minister. He is a member of the Human Rights Protection Party.

He was first elected to the Legislative Assembly of Samoa at the 1991 election. He was re-elected in 1996, and in 2001. In 2001 he was appointed Minister of Legislative Department and Audit (revenue). He was shifted to the Justice portfolio in February 2004 following the death of Justice Minister Seumanu Aita Ah Wa. He lost his seat at the 2006 election.

In 2014 he stood in the 2014 Gagaifomauga by-election, losing to Faimalotoa Kika Stowers.

He was subsequently appointed to the board of the Samoa Trust Estates Corporation.

References

Members of the Legislative Assembly of Samoa
Government ministers of Samoa
Human Rights Protection Party politicians
Living people
Year of birth missing (living people)